Charles Fletcher Swayze (December 26, 1869 – October 10, 1954) was a Canadian politician. He represented Niagara Falls in the Legislative Assembly of Ontario from 1919 to 1923 as a member of the Labour Party, and subsequently served as mayor of Niagara Falls from 1929 to 1934. He died in 1954.

References

External links 
 

Labour MPPs in Ontario
Mayors of Niagara Falls, Ontario
1869 births
1954 deaths